The Bath Children's Literature Festival (also known as Bath Kids' Lit Fest) is an annual book festival held in Bath, Somerset aimed at children's books. The festival features a variety of authors, poets, illustrators and storytellers. It typically lasts ten days, spanning two weekends. Various events are organised in the city during this time, as well as events at local schools in the central week.

The Festival has been organised by John and Gill McLay since its creation in 2008.

The Festival has attracted a wealth of popular and talented guests, including the Children's Laureate Michael Rosen, Michael Morpurgo, Jacqueline Wilson, Harry Hill, Meg Cabot and Axel Scheffler.

References

External links 
 

Children's festivals in the United Kingdom
Festivals in Bath, Somerset
Literary festivals in England